T10 League or Abu Dhabi T10 is a Ten10 cricket league in the United Arab Emirates launched and owned by T Ten Sports Management. The league is approved by the Emirates Cricket Board. Matches are 10-overs-a-side and the duration of each match is approximately 90 minutes. The tournament is a double round-robin followed by Eliminators and the Final. The International Cricket Council (ICC) officially sanctioned the league in 2018 as a semi-professional cricket tournament.

The league has seen significant year-on-year growth in viewership and economic value, with the 2021-2022 edition of the tournament having reached 342 million viewers through television and digital streaming compared to roughly 37 million viewers in the 2017 edition, and the league's economic impact now valued at US$621.2 million.

History 
The league was founded by Shaji Ul Mulk, the chairman of T10 League.

Teams

Rules 
10 out of the 11 players on a team can be overseas players (from any part of the world).

Current teams

Former teams
Bengal Tigers (2017–2018)
Karnataka Tuskers (2019)
Kerala Kings/Knights (2017–2018)
Maratha Arabians (2017–2021)
Pakhtoons (2017–2018)
Pune Devils (2021)
Punjabi Legends (2017–2018)
Qalandars (2019–2021)
Rajputs (2018)
Sindhis (2018)
Team Sri Lanka (2017)

Seasons and winners

See also 

 T10 leagues organised by full-member cricket boards:
 The 6IXTY
 Lanka T10 League
 Zim Afro T10
 Ninety–90 Bash

References

External links 
 

2017 establishments in the United Arab Emirates
Recurring sporting events established in 2017
Short form cricket
Cricket in the United Arab Emirates
Abu Dhabi T10 League